GroupOne Health Source, Inc. is a private company based in Jefferson City, Missouri, with operational sites in St. Louis, Missouri, and Indianapolis, Indiana. The company offers electronic health record medical billing (Revenue Cycle Management), implementation, transcription, and consulting services. GroupOne primarily provides services to private medical practices and hospital owned medical groups. As of January 31, 2007 GroupOne Health Source, Inc. operates as a subsidiary of Pradot Technologies Private Limited.

History 
GroupOne Health Source was established by Dianne Swanson in 1991 to deliver medical billing services to local medical practices using the Medical Manager practice management software.

In 2002 GroupOne Health Source became a value-added reseller for Alteer, an early entrant in the electronic health record (EHR) industry. GroupOne provided sales, training, implementation, and medical billing on the Alteer EHR software. Alteer has since been acquired by CompuGroup Medical

In 2004 GroupOne Health Source ended its agreement with Alteer to sell, train, and implement the electronic health record software. However, GroupOne Health Source continued to offer medical billing services on what is now known as CompuGroup Medical electronic health record software.

Later in 2004 GroupOne Health Source became a certified reseller of the eClinicalWorks Electronic Health Record (EHR)software. GroupOne Health Source provides sales, training, implementation, support, medical billing, and revenue cycle management (RCM) services to medical practices across the United States.

Products and Services 
GroupOne Health Source offers a number of services. As a certified reseller of the eClinicalWorks electronic health records software, GroupOne Health Source is also able to sell, implement, train, and offer support to medical practices across the United States seeking electronic health record software.

 OneRate  A combination of eClinicalWorks electronic health record (EHR) software and GroupOne Health Source medical billing services.
 eClinicalWorks Software  Integrated electronic medical records (EMR)and practice management (PM) software allowing users to chart patient visits, electronically prescribe medications, achieve Meaningful Use incentives, and prepare for ICD-10.
 EHR Revenue Cycle Management (RCM)  A practice management service consisting of medical coding and review by Certified Professional Coders, eligibility verification, medical claims submission, patient statement processing, claim denial review and appeals, patient billing questions and phone call management, claim follow up, and financial reporting and tracking of key performance indicators. All services are provided on whichever electronic health records software is utilized by the medical practice. GroupOne has provided RCM services on multiple EHR systems, including eClinicalWorks, Allscripts, Meditech, Greenway, MicroMD, Practice Fusion, and others.
 Transcription  Toll-free telephone and/or hand-held digital recorder methods of capture with next day turnaround.
 Consulting  Medical coding compliance and chart analysis consulting services.

External links 
 GroupOne Health Source, Inc.

References 

Companies based in Missouri
Business services companies established in 1991
Electronic health records
1991 establishments in Missouri